Karl-Walter Böhm (6 June 1938 – 1 June 2000) was a German opera singer (heldentenor).

Career 
In 1974 he sang Max in Weber's Der Freischütz at the Portland Opera. From 1975 to 1977 he appeared four times at the Vienna State Opera.

Some recordings 
 Herod in Salome (conducted by Herbert von Karajan) – HMV-Electrola
 The title role in Rienzi (highlights) – Eurodisc

References

External links 

 Discography on Discogs
 Böhm, Karl-Walter on LMU

1938 births
2000 deaths
Musicians from Nuremberg
German operatic tenors
Heldentenors
20th-century German male opera singers